Ignatienne Nyirarukundo is a Rwandan politician who currently serves as Senior Advisor in Charge of Social Protection Program in the Office of Prime Minister since November 2021.

Career 
Prior to her appointment she was serving as Minister of States in Charge of Social Affairs at Ministry of Local Government of Rwanda since 2019, before that she was Member of the Lower house of Parliament of Rwanda for six years.

References 

21st-century Rwandan women politicians
21st-century Rwandan politicians
Living people
Year of birth missing (living people)